Clarke Road Secondary School is located at 300 Clarke Road in London, Ontario. It is a part of the Thames Valley District School Board. The school was founded in 1956 and a major 14 million dollar renovation was completed in 1997. The school mascot is the Trojan Warrior.

Clarke Road's recent renovation has given the school state-of-the-art gymnasia, science, technology, and computer facilities. The school presently has over 400 computers available for student use in all programs in the school. The renovations have also provided a major developmental centre in the school, as well as integrated programs for over 50 students.

Notable programs
The school's work internship program, School to Work, allows students to gain experience in an industrial setting with over 50 employers throughout the area. The technology department has facilities for woodworking, manufacturing, transportation and communication technologies. Multimillion-dollar renovations in 2012 created programs in Health Care, Green Industries and Hospitality. The school has a full commercial kitchen, and green house, as well as a TV studio and 24 hour radio station broadcasting through the Tune-In radio app. Previous renovations at Clarke Road also featured a wide variety of programs in the arts, including courses in the visual arts, drama, dance, vocals, instrumental and guitar music.

Extracurricular activities
Clarke Road offers a large variety of extracurricular clubs and groups. Some of the more popular activities include yearly drama productions, art shows, the environmental club, the learning support centre, and the cancer campaign. The school also participates in "Take Your Kids to Work" day and used to grow an urban vegetable garden on the property every year.

Student body
The following is an approximation of the student body, as of September 2015:
 320 students in grade 9
 350 students in grade 10
 300 students in grade 11, 
 410 students in grade 12.
There are 97 full-time teachers and three guidance counsellors. The teacher-to-student ratio is 1:14.

Post-secondary statistics
As of June 2008:
 45% of students apply to college
 40% of students enter the workforce
 15% of students apply to university

See also
List of high schools in Ontario

References

External links
 Clarke Road Secondary School

Educational institutions established in 1956
High schools in London, Ontario
1956 establishments in Ontario